Michael Patrick Thomas Healy (born 3 August 1964) is an Australian politician. He has been the Labor member for Cairns in the Queensland Legislative Assembly since 2017.

References

Parliamentary Profile

1964 births
Living people
Members of the Queensland Legislative Assembly
Australian Labor Party members of the Parliament of Queensland
21st-century Australian politicians
Labor Right politicians